Diana M. Zuckerman (born 16 June 1950) is an American health policy analyst who focuses on the implications of policies for public health and patients' health. She specializes in national health policy, particularly in women's health and the safety and effectiveness of medical products. She is the President of the National Center for Health Research (formerly National Research Center for Women & Families) and the Cancer Prevention and Treatment Fund.

Early life and education
Zuckerman earned her B.A. in psychology from Smith College and then obtained a Ph.D in psychology from the Ohio State University in 1977. At Yale Medical School she was a post-doctoral fellow in epidemiology and public health from 1979 to 1980.

Career
She was on the faculty at Vassar College and Yale University, and directed a longitudinal study of college students as director of the Seven College Study at Harvard University, publishing books and articles on the impact of media on children, the impact of religion on the health of the elderly, and how women's life experiences influence their mental and physical health. She left academia in 1983 when she was selected as a Fellow in the American Association for the Advancement of Science Congressional Science Fellowship program.

From 1985 to 1993 she worked at the U.S. Congress in a House subcommittee where she was responsible for a dozen Congressional oversight investigations on health and social policy, including political manipulation of government grants to prevent child abuse, lack of safeguards for infertility treatments, financial conflicts of interest among National Institutes of Health (NIH) grant recipients, and the lack of safety studies on breast implants. Information from the hearings received widespread public health, government, and media attention, resulting in several policy and regulatory changes, including the U.S. Food and Drug Administration (FDA) requiring implant manufacturers to submit safety studies for the first time.

In 1993, Zuckerman joined the staff of the Senate Veterans Affairs Committee and began an investigation that resulted in the first Congressional hearings focused on the possible causes of Gulf War syndrome. In 1995 she was a senior policy advisor in the Clinton Administration. From 1996, she undertook leading roles in non-profit organizations, including, from 1999, presidency of the National Research Center for Women & Families (renamed the National Center for Health Research in 2014) and The Cancer Prevention and Treatment Fund.

Her work focuses on improving the quality of medical products and healthcare in the United States. She has been highly critical of scientific and medical research paid for by companies, who then use this to promote their products, as well as the lack of media coverage on independently funded research that challenges industry-funded research. She has said:
You've heard of junk science — a term coined by corporations to describe research they don't like — but the real danger to public health might be called "checkbook science": research intended not to expand knowledge or to benefit humanity, but instead to sell products.

In February 2011, Zuckerman and colleagues Paul Brown and Dr. Steven Nissen published a study in the peer-reviewed journal Archives of Internal Medicine, which evaluated the FDA's recalls of devices that the agency considered potentially deadly or otherwise very high risk. Based on FDA data, the authors determined that most of the devices that were high-risk recalls had never been studied in clinical trials prior to FDA approval, and that the FDA needed to use more stringent criteria for implanted medical devices and those used to diagnose serious illnesses, and an editorial in the same issue agreed.
In April 2011, Zuckerman presented the results of the study at a hearing by the U.S. Senate Special Committee on Aging.

Zuckerman is the author of five books, several book chapters, and dozens of articles in medical and academic journals, and in newspapers across the country. Her policy work has resulted in news coverage on all the major TV networks, including ABC, CBS, NBC, CNN, Fox News, public television, 60 Minutes, 20/20, National Public Radio, and in major U.S. print media such as The New York Times, The Washington Post, The Washington Times, Los Angeles Times, The Boston Globe, USA Today, Detroit Free Press, New York Daily News, Newsweek, Time, U.S. News & World Report, Family Circle, The New Yorker, Glamour, Self, as well as many other newspapers, magazines, and radio programs.

Published articles

Zuckerman frequently writes articles regarding medical drugs and devices, as well as public health policy. Recent articles published in peer-reviewed journals include:
 

 Zuckerman, D., Tomes, M & Murphy, A. (2017) Are Gummy Bear Breast Implants the Safer Implants? In Breast Implants, Rene Simon (ed), Nova Science.
 
 Ronquillo, J.G. & Zuckerman, D. M. (2017) Software-Related Recalls of Health Information Technology and Other Medical Devices: Implications for FDA Regulation of Digital Health. Milbank Quarterly. 95(3): 535–553.
 
 
 
 Zuckerman, D.M. & Silcox, C.E. (2016) The Challenges of Informed Consent When Information and Time are Limited. In Informed Consent: Procedures, Ethics and Best Practices, Winston Hammond (ed.), Nova Science.
 
 Zuckerman, D.M. (2015) Understanding the Controversies Over a Groundbreaking New Health Care Law. http://www.milbank.org/the-milbank-quarterly/the-op-eds/understanding-thecontroversies-over-a-groundbreaking-new-health-care-law

References

Health economists
Smith College alumni
Living people
1950 births
Ohio State University Graduate School alumni
Vassar College faculty
Yale University faculty
Harvard University staff
University of Pennsylvania staff
Place of birth missing (living people)
University of Pennsylvania fellows